The Basel trolleybus system was part of the public transport network of Basel, Switzerland, for nearly six decades.  Opened in 1941, it combined after 1997 with the Basel Regional S-Bahn, the Basel tramway network and Basel's urban motorbus network to form an integrated all-four style scheme until its closure in 2008.

The trolleybus system was operated by Basler Verkehrs-Betriebe (BVB), which also operates Basel's motorbus network and some of the trams on its tramway network.  At its height, the trolleybus system consisted of three lines, two of which ran into the neighbouring municipality of Riehen, north of Basel.

History
The individual sections of the Basel trolleybus system went into service as follows:

Line 34 was converted to motorbus operation on 9 September 2000. A conversion of line 33 followed on 13 December 2004.

A popular initiative to rescue the trolleybuses then occurred, but on 17 June 2007 the initiative was rejected by a 27,403 to 23,645 (53.7%) majority of the voting citizens.  Subsequently, the final trolleybus run on line 31 took place on 30 June 2008.

Fleet
A total of 52 trolleybuses were procured for the Basel trolleybus system.  All of them were supplied new, apart from nos. 921 and 922, which were acquired second-hand from the Kaiserslautern trolleybus system in Germany:

Up until the closure of the system, motorbus no. 48 served as an overhead wire de-icer, and for that purpose was fitted with trolley poles.

Some of the retired trolleybuses were transferred to Pazardzhik and Ruse in Bulgaria as well as Braşov in Romania.  Trolleybus no. 358 is now in the possession of the Lausanne-based RétroBus Léman museum society.

Depot
The vehicles in Basel's trolleybus fleet were kept at the Rankstrasse bus garage, on line 31.  The garage was also connected with line 33 via non-revenue wires (wiring not used for passenger service) from Basel Badischer Bahnhof.

See also

List of trolleybus systems in Switzerland

References

Notes

Further reading

External links

 
 
 RétroBus Léman – official site

Transport in Basel
Basel
Basel
1941 establishments in Switzerland
2008 disestablishments in Switzerland